Mike Schertzer (born May 27, 1965 in Brantford, Ontario) is a Canadian poet and artist.

Schertzer graduated in 1987 from the University of British Columbia with a B.Sc. in biology, and lived for some time in Vancouver, British Columbia. In 2017 he obtained a PhD from the Université Pierre-et-Marie-Curie/Sorbonne Universités (ED515, Complexité du Vivant). He currently lives and works in Paris, France.

According to his personal homepage, he has worked as a research technician since 1987, and as of 2009, he has been employed as a molecular biologist at the Curie Institute in Paris, France. Of his artistic work, he says

"I practice a unique form of collage, which I call 'Sublimage' (paper and acrylic on glass). I also create text-based art, mostly overpainted books (negatexts). I also do performances and interventions that typically run for at least 8 hours."

He claims to have devised the longest acronym in the English language, Acronymic in his book Cipher and Poverty.

Books
The following are some books by Schertzer:
 The House of Misfortune (1994). Tonguenail Books.
 Short Films from the 14th Century (1994). Exile Editions.
 A Hand for the Drowned (1994). Ekstasis Editions.
 A Personal Dictionary' '(1997). Tonguenail Books.
 Cipher and Poverty (The Book of Nothing) (1998). Ekstasis Editions.
 Absulation(1998). Self-published.
 Devil's Wine (2003). Self-published.
 Peindicy (2007). Exile Editions.

Performances and interventions
 Opacity''.  Vancouver (2000)
Les Essais 
Diderot 2013 
Les Ville Invisibles (Nuit Blanche 2015, Bruxelles)
Pain Proust

References

See also

 Lipogram
 Constrained writing

1965 births
Living people
Canadian male poets
Artists from Ontario
Writers from Brantford
20th-century Canadian poets
21st-century Canadian poets
20th-century Canadian male writers
21st-century Canadian male writers
Canadian performance artists